Matthias Heinrich Elias Eddelien (22 January 1802  – 24 December 1852) was a Danish history painter of German origin.

Biography
Eddelien was born in Greifswald, Germany. He was the son of David Niclas  Erdelien and Johanna Dorothea Jäde.
Eddelien arrived in Copenhagen as a young man and attended the Royal Danish Academy of Fine Arts from 1821 studying under Christoffer Wilhelm Eckersberg (1783–1853).   In 1837, he was awarded the Academy's large gold medal. From 1839 to 1843, he travelled to Italy and Germany to widen his studies. His paintings often had motifs from ancient mythology or from the Bible. His altarpieces included at  St. Nicolai Church in Svendborg (Svendborg Sankt Nikolai kirke).

His decorative works included the Pompeian Apartment in the Palace of King Christian VIII of Denmark at Amalienborg Palace. His principal work was the decoration of King Christian IV of Denmark's Chapel in Roskilde Cathedral but this led to paralysis in his right arm.

Personal life
In 1839, he married Olivia Francisca Hjorth (1811-1892). Heinrich Eddelien died during 1852 while receiving spa treatment at Stuer, Germany.
His widow later married goldsmith and artisan Jørgen Balthasar Dalhoff (1800-1890).

References

1802 births
1852 deaths
Royal Danish Academy of Fine Arts alumni
People from Greifswald
19th-century Danish painters
Danish male painters
19th-century Danish male artists